Benaroya may refer to:

People
 Avraam Benaroya (1887–1979), Jewish socialist in the Ottoman Empire
 Jack Benaroya (1921–2012), American philanthropist and civic leader in Seattle, Washington
 Michael Benaroya (born 1981),  American film producer

Other uses
 Benaroya Hall, home of the Seattle Symphony in Seattle, Washington, United States
 Benaroya Research Institute, Seattle, Washington non-profit organization